Bisphosphoglycerate may refer to:

 1,3-Bisphosphoglycerate (1,3-BPG)
 2,3-Bisphosphoglycerate (2,3-BPG)
 Bisphosphoglycerate mutase
 Bisphosphoglycerate phosphatase